Nine ships of the Royal Navy have been named HMS Grafton, while another one was planned:

 was a 70-gun third-rate ship of the line launched in 1679, rebuilt in 1700, and captured by the French in 1707.
 was a fire ship purchased in 1694 and sold in 1696.
 was a 70-gun third rate launched in 1709, rebuilt in 1725 and broken up in 1744.
 was a 70-gun third rate launched in 1750 and sold in 1767.
 was a 74-gun third rate launched in 1771. She was used for harbour service from 1792 and was broken up in 1816.
 was an  launched in 1892 and broken up in 1920.
 was a G-class destroyer launched in 1935 and torpedoed in 1940.
HMS Grafton was to have been a destroyer. She was ordered in 1944 but was cancelled in 1945.
 was a Type 23 frigate.  She was sold to the Chilean Navy and delivered in 2007, being renamed Almirante Lynch FF 07.

Battle honours
Ships named Grafton have earned the following battle honours:
Barfleur 1692
Vigo 1702
Gibraltar 1704
Velez Malaga 1704
Passero 1718
Porto Novo 1759
Dardanelles 1915–16
Atlantic 1939
Dunkirk 1940

References

Royal Navy ship names